The Soul Clinic is the second album led by saxophonist Hank Crawford featuring performances recorded in 1961 (with one track from 1960) for the Atlantic label.

Reception

AllMusic awarded the album 3 stars.

Track listing
All compositions by Hank Crawford except as indicated
 "Please Send Me Someone to Love" (Percy Mayfield) - 3:31
 "Easy Living" (Ralph Rainger, Leo Robin) - 5:28
 "Playmates" - 4:22
 "What a Diff'rence a Day Made" (María Grever, Stanley Adams) - 5:31
 "Me and My Baby" (Horace Silver) - 4:22
 "Lorelei's Lament" - 5:37
 "Blue Stone" - 6:03

Personnel 
Hank Crawford - alto saxophone, piano
Phillip Guilbeau - trumpet (trumpet solo on "What A Difference A Day Makes")
John Hunt - trumpet
David Newman - tenor saxophone
Leroy Cooper - baritone saxophone
Edgar Willis - bass
Bruno Carr - drums
Milt Turner - drums (on "What A Difference A Day Makes" only)

References 

1962 albums
Hank Crawford albums
Atlantic Records albums
Albums produced by Nesuhi Ertegun